Nyiyaparli (Nyiyabali, Njijabali, or misspelled Nijadali) is a nearly extinct Pama–Nyungan language spoken by the Palyku (Bailko) and Niabali (Jana) people of Western Australia. There's a formal language register known as padupadu.

References

Ngarla